James J. Agazzi (October 23, 1940 – September 15, 2019) was an American art director and production designer.

Life and career 
Agazzi was born in Joliet, Illinois, the son of Dorothy Kokalj and George Agazzi. He attended the University of California.

In 1981, Agazzi was nominated for his first Primetime Emmy Award for his work on the television program Hart to Hart. His nomination was shared with Paul Sylos and Robert Signorelli. He won an Emmy in 1989 for Outstanding Art Direction for a Series and was nominated for six more in the category Outstanding Art Direction for his work on Moonlighting, There Must Be a Pony and Liz: The Elizabeth Taylor Story. He was a production manager.

Agazzi died in September 2019, at the age of 78.

References

External links 

1940 births
2019 deaths
People from Joliet, Illinois
American art directors
American production designers
Unit production managers
Primetime Emmy Award winners
University of California, Los Angeles alumni